Mel Brock (George Melville Brock; February 3, 1888 – October 4, 1956) was a Canadian track and field athlete who competed in the 1912 Summer Olympics.

In 1912 he finished fourth in the 800 metres competition. In the 400 metres event he was eliminated in the first round. He was also a member of the Canadian relay team which was eliminated in the first round of the 4x400 metre relay event.

References

External links 
 Profile at Sports-Reference.com

1888 births
1956 deaths
Canadian male middle-distance runners
Olympic track and field athletes of Canada
Athletes (track and field) at the 1912 Summer Olympics